Franz Schubert's compositions of 1821 are mostly in the Deutsch catalogue (D) range D 708A–732, and include:
 Instrumental works:
 Symphony No. 7, D 728
 Vocal music:
 Alfonso und Estrella, D 732 (composition started in September 1821)

Table

Legend

List

|-
| 615
| data-sort-value="708B" | 708A
| data-sort-value="ZZZZ" |
| data-sort-value="ZZZZ" |
| data-sort-value="506,10" | V, 6 No. 10
| Symphony, D 708A
| data-sort-value="key D major" | D major
| data-sort-value="1821-01-01" | 1821 orlater
| Sketches of four movements
|-
| 709
| 709
| data-sort-value="XXX,1891" | (1891)
| data-sort-value="1600,031" | XVINo. 31
| data-sort-value="304,47" | III, 4No. 47
| data-sort-value="Fruhlingsgesang, D 709" | Frühlingsgesang, D 709
| data-sort-value="text Schmucket die Locken mit duftigen Kranzen 1" | Schmücket die Locken mit duftigen Kränzen
| data-sort-value="1822-03-01" | March 1822or earlier
| data-sort-value="Text by Schober, Franz von, Schmucket die Locken mit duftigen Kranzen 1" | Text by Schober (other setting, partly reusing music of this setting); For ttbb
|-
| 710
| 710
| data-sort-value="XXX,1849" | (1849)
| data-sort-value="1600,015" | XVINo. 15
| data-sort-value="303,26" | III, 3 No. 26
| data-sort-value="Im Gegenwartigen Vergangenes" | Im Gegenwärtigen Vergangenes
| data-sort-value="text Ros und Lilie morgentaulich" | Ros und Lilie morgentaulich
| data-sort-value="1821-03-01" | March 1821?
| data-sort-value="Text by Goethe, Johann Wolfgang von, O gib vom weichen Pfuhle" | Text by Goethe; For ttbb and piano
|-
| 711
| 711
| data-sort-value="013,1822-2" | 13,2(1822)(1970)
| data-sort-value="2005,294" | XX, 5No. 294
| data-sort-value="401,0132" | IV, 1a &b No. 11
| data-sort-value="Lob der Tranen" | Lob der Tränen
| data-sort-value="text Laue Lufte, Blumendufte" | Laue Lüfte, Blumendüfte
| data-sort-value="1818-01-01" | 1818–1821?
| data-sort-value="Text by Schlegel, August Wilhelm, Laue Lufte, Blumendufte" | Text by Schlegel, A. W.; Two versions: 2nd, in AGA, is Op. 13 No. 2
|-
| 712
| 712
| data-sort-value="XXX,1842" | (1842)
| data-sort-value="2006,389" | XX, 6No. 389
| data-sort-value="413,00" | IV, 13
| data-sort-value="Gefangenen Sanger, Die" | Die gefangenen Sänger
| data-sort-value="text Horst du von den Nachtigallen" | Hörst du von den Nachtigallen
| data-sort-value="1821-01-01" | January1821
| data-sort-value="Text by Schlegel, August Wilhelm, Horst du von den Nachtigallen" | Text by Schlegel, A. W.
|-
| 713
| 713
| data-sort-value="087,1827-1" | 87,1(1827)(1895)
| data-sort-value="2006,390" | XX, 6No. 390
| data-sort-value="404,00" | IV, 4
| data-sort-value="Ungluckliche, Der" | Der Unglückliche
| data-sort-value="text Die Nacht bricht an" | Die Nacht bricht an
| data-sort-value="1821-01-01" | January1821
| data-sort-value="Text by Pichler, Karoline, Die Nacht bricht an" | Text by Pichler; Two versions: 2nd is Op. 87 No. 1
|-
| data-sort-value="714" | 714704
| 714
| data-sort-value="167,1858-0" | 167p(1858)(1891)
| data-sort-value="1600,003" | XVINo. 3 &No. 45
| data-sort-value="301,00" | III, 1
| data-sort-value="Gesang der Geister uber den Wassern, D 714" | Gesang der Geister über den Wassern, D 714
| data-sort-value="text Des Menschen Seele gleicht dem Wasser 4" | Des Menschen Seele gleicht dem Wasser
| data-sort-value="1821-02-01" | Dec. 1820–Feb. 1821
| data-sort-value="Text by Goethe, Johann Wolfgang von, Des Menschen Seele gleicht dem Wasser 4" | Text by Goethe (other settings: , 538 and 705); For ttttbbbb, two violas, two cellos and double bass; Two versions: 1st, a sketch, was D 704 – 2nd is Op. posth. 167
|-
| 715
| 715
| data-sort-value="XXX,1845" | (1845)
| data-sort-value="2006,391" | XX, 6No. 391
| data-sort-value="413,00" | IV, 13
| Versunken
| data-sort-value="text Voll Locken kraus ein Haupt so rund" | Voll Locken kraus ein Haupt so rund
| data-sort-value="1821-02-01" | February1821
| data-sort-value="Text by Goethe, Johann Wolfgang von, Voll Locken kraus ein Haupt so rund" | Text by Goethe
|-
| 716
| 716
| data-sort-value="XXX,1832" | (1832)
| data-sort-value="2006,393" | XX, 6No. 393
| data-sort-value="413,00" | IV, 13
| Grenzen der Menschheit
| data-sort-value="text Wenn der uralte heilige Vater" | Wenn der uralte heilige Vater
| data-sort-value="1821-03-01" | March 1821
| data-sort-value="Text by Goethe, Johann Wolfgang von, Wenn der uralte heilige Vater" | Text by Goethe; For b and piano
|-
| 717
| 717
| data-sort-value="031,1825-0" | 31(1825)
| data-sort-value="2006,397" | XX, 6No. 397
| data-sort-value="402,0310" | IV, 2a
| Suleika II
| data-sort-value="text Ach um deine feuchten Schwingen" | Ach um deine feuchten Schwingen
| data-sort-value="1821-03-01" | March? 1821
| data-sort-value="Text by Willemer, Marianne von, Ach um deine feuchten Schwingen" | Text by Willemer
|-
| 718
| 718
| data-sort-value="XXX,1824" | (1824)
| data-sort-value="1100,008" | XI No. 8
| data-sort-value="724,00" | VII/2, 4
| Variation on a Waltz by Anton Diabelli
| data-sort-value="key C minor" | C minor
| data-sort-value="1821-03-01" | March 1821
| For piano; No. 38 in Vaterländischer Künstlerverein Vol. II
|-
| 719
| 719
| data-sort-value="014,1822-2" | 14,2(1822)
| data-sort-value="2006,392" | XX, 6No. 392
| data-sort-value="401,0142" | IV, 1a
| Geheimes
| data-sort-value="text Uber meines Liebchens Augeln" | Über meines Liebchens Äugeln
| data-sort-value="1821-03-01" | March 1821
| data-sort-value="Text by Goethe, Johann Wolfgang von, Uber meines Liebchens Augeln" | Text by Goethe
|-
| 720
| 720
| data-sort-value="014,1822-1" | 14,1(1822)
| data-sort-value="2006,396" | XX, 6No. 396
| data-sort-value="401,0141" | IV, 1a &b No. 13
| Suleika I
| data-sort-value="text Was bedeutet die Bewegung?" | Was bedeutet die Bewegung?
| data-sort-value="1821-03-01" | March 1821
| data-sort-value="Text by Willemer, Marianne von, Was bedeutet die Bewegung?" | Text by Willemer; Two versions; 2nd, in AGA, is Op. 14 No. 1
|-
| 721
| 721
| data-sort-value="XXX,1895" | (1895)
| data-sort-value="2010,600" | XX, 10No. 600
| data-sort-value="413,00" | IV, 13
| Mahomets Gesang, D 721
| data-sort-value="text Seht den Felsenquell 2" | Seht den Felsenquell
| data-sort-value="1821-03-01" | March 1821
| data-sort-value="Text by Goethe, Johann Wolfgang von, Seht den Felsenquell 2" | Text by Goethe; For b and piano; Fragment
|-
| 722
| 722
| data-sort-value="XXX,1889" | (1889)
| data-sort-value="1200,019" | XIINo. 19
| data-sort-value="726,00" | VII/2, 6
| German Dance, D 722
| data-sort-value="key G-flat major" | G major
| data-sort-value="1821-03-08" | 8/3/1821
| For piano
|-
| 723
| 723
| data-sort-value="XXX,1893" | (1893)
| data-sort-value="1507,015" | XV, 7No. 15
| data-sort-value="218,00" | II, 18
| data-sort-value="Duet and Aria for Herold's Das Zauberglockchen" | Duet and Aria for Hérold's Das Zauberglöckchen
| data-sort-value="text Nein, nein, nein, nein, das ist zu viel" | Nein, nein, nein, nein, das ist zu viel – Der Tag entflieht, der Abend glüht
| data-sort-value="1821-05-01" | Apr.–May1821
| data-sort-value="Text by Theaulon, Emmanuel, transl. by Treitschke, Nein, nein, nein, nein, das ist zu viel"| Text by Théaulon, transl. by Treitschke;Duet for tb and aria for t (both with orchestra)
|-
| 724
| 724
| data-sort-value="011,1822-2" | 11,2(1822)
| data-sort-value="1600,005" | XVINo. 5
| data-sort-value="303,27" | III, 3 No. 27
| data-sort-value="Nachtigall, Die" | Die Nachtigall
| data-sort-value="text Bescheiden verborgen im buschigten Gang" | Bescheiden verborgen im buschigten Gang
| data-sort-value="1821-04-22" | 22/4/1821or earlier
|-
| 725
| 725
| data-sort-value="XXX,1929" | (1929)
| data-sort-value="ZZZZ" |
| data-sort-value="302,95" | III, 2bAnh. No. 5
| Duet, D 725
| data-sort-value="text Linde Lufte wehen" | Linde Lüfte wehen, or: Linde Weste wehen
| data-sort-value="1821-04-01" | April 1821
| Fragment for mezzo-soprano, tenor and piano
|-
| 726
| 726
| data-sort-value="XXX,1870" | (1870)
| data-sort-value="2006,394" | XX, 6No. 394
| data-sort-value="403,00" | IV, 3
| Mignon I, D 726
| data-sort-value="text Heiss mich nicht reden 1" | Heiß mich nicht reden
| data-sort-value="1821-04-01" | April 1821
| data-sort-value="Text by Goethe, Johann Wolfgang von from Wilhelm Meister's Apprenticeship, Heiss mich nicht reden 1" | Text by Goethe, from Wilhelm Meister's Apprenticeship (other setting:  No. 2)
|-
| 727
| 727
| data-sort-value="XXX,1850" | (1850)
| data-sort-value="2006,395" | XX, 6No. 395
| data-sort-value="403,00" | IV, 3
| Mignon II, D 727
| data-sort-value="text So lasst mich scheinen, bis ich werde 2" | So laßt mich scheinen, bis ich werde
| data-sort-value="1821-04-01" | April 1821
| data-sort-value="Text by Goethe, Johann Wolfgang von from Wilhelm Meister's Apprenticeship, So lasst mich scheinen, bis ich werde 2" | Text by Goethe, from Wilhelm Meister's Apprenticeship (other settings:  and 877 No. 3)
|-
| 728
| 728
| data-sort-value="XXX,1895" | (1895)
| data-sort-value="2010,601" | XX, 10No. 601
| data-sort-value="413,00" | IV, 13
| Johanna Sebus
| data-sort-value="text Der Damm zerreisst" | Der Damm zerreißt
| data-sort-value="1821-04-01" | April 1821
| data-sort-value="Text by Goethe, Johann Wolfgang von, Der Damm zerreisst" | Text by Goethe; Fragment
|-
| 729
| 729
| data-sort-value="XXX,1894" | (1894)(1934)
| data-sort-value="ZZZZ" |
| data-sort-value="506,07" | V, 6 No. 7& Anh 1
| data-sort-value="Symphony No. 07" | Symphony No. 7
| data-sort-value="key E major" | E major
| data-sort-value="1821-08-01" | August1821
| Adagio, Allegro – Andante – Scherzo – Allegro giusto; Sketches; First editions are completions by others (piano reduction in 1894)
|-
| 730
| 730
| data-sort-value="XXX,1926" | (1926)
| data-sort-value="ZZZZ" |
| data-sort-value="109,008" | I, 9No. 8
| Tantum ergo, D 730
| data-sort-value="key B-flat major" | B major
| data-sort-value="1821-08-16" | 16/8/1821
| data-sort-value="Text by Aquinas, Thomas, Tantum ergo 3" | Text by Aquinas (other settings: , 461, 739, 750, 962 and Anh. I/17); For satbSATB and orchestra
|-
| 731
| 731
| data-sort-value="173,1821-4" | 173p,4(1821)
| data-sort-value="2006,399" | XX, 6No. 399
| data-sort-value="405,00" | IV, 5
| data-sort-value="Blumen Schmerz, Der" | Der Blumen Schmerz
| data-sort-value="text Wie tont es mir so schaurig" | Wie tönt es mir so schaurig
| data-sort-value="1821-09-01" | September1821
| data-sort-value="Text by Majlath, Janos, Wie tont es mir so schaurig" | Text by Majláth; Publ. as Op. posth. 173 No. 4 in 1867
|-
| data-sort-value="732" | 732683
| 732
| data-sort-value="XXX,1833" | (1833)(1834)(1867)(1882)(1892)
| data-sort-value="1505,009" | XV, 4No. 8(Ov.)XV, 5No. 9
| data-sort-value="206,01" | II, 6a–cIV, 14
| Alfonso und Estrella
| data-sort-value="theatre (Opera in 3 acts)" | (Opera in three acts)
| data-sort-value="1822-02-27" | 20/9/1821–27/2/1822
|}

Lists of compositions by Franz Schubert
Compositions by Franz Schubert
Schubert